The End of the Road World Tour is the ongoing final concert tour by the American rock band Kiss. The tour began on January 31, 2019, at Rogers Arena in Vancouver, Canada and is set to conclude on December 2, 2023 at Madison Square Garden in New York City, United States.

Background 

The tour was announced on September 19, 2018, following a performance of "Detroit Rock City" on America's Got Talent. Tour dates were officially announced for North America, Europe and Oceania on October 30, 2018. Professional painter David Garibaldi served as Kiss's opening act for the 2019 North American and European legs of the tour. David Lee Roth was later announced as the opening act for the 2020 North American leg.

Due to the COVID-19 pandemic, most of the shows that were to take place in 2020 were postponed into 2021, with the final show being postponed to a later date to be announced.

The band later announced on November 20, 2020 that they would perform an exclusive New Year's Eve 2020 livestream show. The Kiss New Year's Eve 2020 Goodbye livestream concert was produced by City Drive Studios and directed by Daniel Catullo. The pay-per-view concert was part of the Landmarks Live Series and was filmed with over fifty 4K cameras with 360-degree views on a 250-foot stage at The Royal Beach at Atlantis The Palm, Dubai. The performance broke two Guinness World Records: one for the highest flame projection in a music concert and another for the most flame projections launched simultaneously in a music concert. On June 11, 2021, following the premiere of the band's documentary Biography: Kisstory at the Tribeca Film Festival, the band performed a five-song set at Battery Park in New York City.

In an October 2021 interview, Stanley stated that Kiss' final concert together is estimated to take place in early 2023: "I believe strongly by the beginning of 2023 we will be finished, it seems only natural for the final show to be in New York. That is where the band started, and that was really the background for the band getting together and writing these songs and played loft parties and played clubs starting with an audience of probably 10 people. It seems we should go full circle." The band performed on board the 2022 edition of the Kiss Kruise in October to November 2022, which was their final time they would perform on the cruise.

In addition to adding another 100 cities on tour into 2023, Simmons stated that he will continue working with the American rock-inspired restaurant Rock & Brews, and performing with his solo band when the final tour has concluded. He later stated that the band will be retiring out of self-respect and love for the fans and that he will be very emotional during the band's final performance which he presumed would take place around 2024, although the band's manager Doc McGhee insisted the band's final show would "definitely" take place in 2023. The band later confirmed the final leg with the final show taking place in New York City on the Howard Stern Show on March 1, 2023.

In the tour program for the final tour, both Stanley and Simmons commented on the tour:

Reception 

Vancouver Suns Stuart Derdeyn, who had attended the tour's opening night in Vancouver, Canada, gave the show a positive review, stating: "After being treated to an opening trio of tunes that included "Detroit Rock City", "Shout It Out Loud" and "Deuce" embellish with as much pyrotechnics as other bands might use for an entire show, the crowd at the opening night of the KISS 'End of the World' tour was right in the sweet spot that the New York City quartet has always been able to get them into."

Chris Jordan from the Asbury Park Press who had attended the Madison Square Garden performance on March 27, 2019, gave the concert a positive review. He noted the large amount of energy that the band had, as well as praising the amount of explosions, fire breathing and elevated risers. The reporter closed the review, stating: "By the time the band got to 'Rock and Roll All Nite', with a burst of confetti to close the show, it was apparent. You were rocked."

Nikki O'Neill from the Chicago Tribune who had attended the performance in Chicago, stated: "Saturday's show was delivered by a musically tight and drama-free band. Original member Paul Stanley especially seemed to have fun on stage, often letting a smile crack through his "Starchild" makeup, addressing the crowd in his unmistakable stage voice, which best can be described as a mix of Southern rock 'n' roll preacher and fired up drag queen. Although the show is super-scripted - because of the ample pyrotechnics, the band would argue - there's not a moment of dullness or dead air as KISS gave the audience a live summary of its career, with 20 songs representing the classic '70s era and the makeup-free '80s, performing only one song from the '90s and one from 2009 with the current lineup."

 Opening acts 
David Garibaldi (North America 2019, Europe 2019, North America 2021)
The New Roses (May 27 in Leipzig, 29 in Vienna and 31 in Munich, Europe 2019, June 1 in Dortmund and June 24 in Frankfurt, Europe 2022)
David Lee Roth (North America 2020)
Frank's White Canvas (April 19 in Santiago, Latin America 2022)
Catoni (April 20 in Santiago, Latin America 2022)
Arde La Sangre (April 23 in Buenos Aires, Latin America 2022)
The Last Internationale (June 7, July 21, Europe 2022)
Shiraz Lane (June 20 in Helsinki, Europe 2022)
Mammoth WVH (July 5 in Nîmes, Europe 2022)
Wolfmother (Australia 2022)
Tumbleweed (Australia 2022)
Mulga Bore Hard Rock (Australia 2022)
Skindred (United Kingdom 2023)
The Wild Things (United Kingdom 2023)
Skid Row (Europe 2023)

 Setlists 
{{hidden
| headercss = background: #ccccff; font-size: 100%; width: 55%;
| contentcss = text-align: left; font-size: 100%; width: 55%;
| header = Leg 1 – North America

| content = 
"Detroit Rock City"
"Shout It Out Loud"
"Deuce"
"Say Yeah"
"Heaven's on Fire"
"War Machine" (Gene breathes fire)
"Lick It Up" (with "Won't Get Fooled Again" by The Who snippet)
"100,000 Years" (with drum solo)
"God of Thunder" (with bass solo; Gene spits blood)
"Cold Gin" (with guitar solo)
"Psycho Circus"
"I Love It Loud"
"Hide Your Heart"
"Let Me Go, Rock 'n' Roll"
"Love Gun" (Paul flies to stage in crowd)
"I Was Made for Lovin' You"
"Black Diamond"Encore:'
"Beth" (Eric Singer on piano)
"Do You Love Me"
"Rock and Roll All Nite"

Setlist slightly varied between shows
"Calling Dr. Love" was performed prior to "100,000 Years" starting in New Orleans on February 22, 2019, replacing "Hide Your Heart".
"I Love It Loud" was moved in between "Say Yeah" and "Heaven's on Fire" starting in Omaha on March 7, 2019.
}}

{{hidden
| headercss = background: #ccccff; font-size: 100%; width: 55%;
| contentcss = text-align: left; font-size: 100%; width: 55%;
| header = Leg 2 – Europe
| content = 
"Detroit Rock City"
"Shout It Out Loud"
"Deuce"
"Say Yeah"
"I Love It Loud"
"Heaven's on Fire"
"War Machine" (Gene breathes fire)
"Lick It Up" (with "Won't Get Fooled Again" by The Who snippet)
"Calling Dr. Love"
"100,000 Years" (with drum solo)
"Cold Gin" (with guitar solo)
"God of Thunder" (with bass solo; Gene spits blood)
"Psycho Circus"
"Let Me Go, Rock 'n' Roll"
"Love Gun" (Paul flies to stage in crowd)
"I Was Made for Lovin' You"
"Black Diamond"

Encore:
"Beth" (Eric Singer on piano)
"Crazy Crazy Nights"
"Rock and Roll All Nite"
}}

{{hidden
| headercss = background: #ccccff; font-size: 100%; width: 55%;
| contentcss = text-align: left; font-size: 100%; width: 55%;
| header = Leg 3 – North America
| content = 
"Detroit Rock City"
"Shout It Out Loud"
"Deuce"
"Say Yeah"
"I Love It Loud"
"Heaven's on Fire"
"War Machine" (Gene breathes fire)
"Lick It Up" (with "Won't Get Fooled Again" by The Who snippet)
"Calling Dr. Love"
"100,000 Years" (with drum solo)
"Cold Gin" (with guitar solo)
"God of Thunder" (with bass solo; Gene spits blood)
"Psycho Circus"
"Let Me Go, Rock 'n' Roll"
"Love Gun" (Paul flies to stage in crowd)
"I Was Made for Lovin' You"
"Black Diamond"

Encore:
"Beth" (Eric Singer on piano)
"Crazy Crazy Nights"
"Rock and Roll All Nite"
}}

{{hidden
| headercss = background: #ccccff; font-size: 100%; width: 55%;
| contentcss = text-align: left; font-size: 100%; width: 55%;
| header = Leg 4 – Japan
| content = 
"Detroit Rock City"
"Shout It Out Loud"
"Deuce"
"Say Yeah"
"I Love It Loud"
"Heaven's on Fire"
"War Machine" (Gene breathes fire)
"Lick It Up" (with "Won't Get Fooled Again" by The Who snippet)
"Calling Dr. Love"
"100,000 Years" (with drum solo)
"Cold Gin" (with guitar solo)
"God of Thunder" (with bass solo; Gene spits blood)
"Psycho Circus"
"Let Me Go, Rock 'n' Roll"
"Sukiyaki" (Kyu Sakamoto cover)
"Love Gun" (Paul flies to stage in crowd)
"I Was Made for Lovin' You"
"Black Diamond"

Encore:
"Beth" (Eric Singer on piano)
"Crazy Crazy Nights"
"Rock and Roll All Nite"

Setlist slightly varied between shows
"Crazy Crazy Nights" was replaced by "Do You Love Me" from December 14 onwards.
}}

{{hidden
| headercss = background: #ccccff; font-size: 100%; width: 55%;
| contentcss = text-align: left; font-size: 100%; width: 55%;
| header = Leg 5 – United States
| content = 
"Detroit Rock City"
"Shout It Out Loud"
"Deuce"
"Say Yeah"
"I Love It Loud"
"Heaven's on Fire"
"Tears Are Falling"
"War Machine" (Gene breathes fire)
"Lick It Up" (with "Won't Get Fooled Again" by The Who snippet)
"Calling Dr. Love"
"100,000 Years" (with drum solo)
"Cold Gin" (with guitar solo)
"God of Thunder" (with bass solo; Gene spits blood)
"Psycho Circus"
"Parasite"
"Love Gun" (Paul flies to stage in crowd)
"I Was Made for Lovin' You"
"Black Diamond"

Encore:
"Beth" (Eric Singer on piano)
"Crazy Crazy Nights"
"Rock and Roll All Nite"

Setlist slightly varied between shows
"Crazy Crazy Nights" was replaced by "Do You Love Me" from February 18 onwards.
}}

{{hidden
| headercss = background: #ccccff; font-size: 100%; width: 55%;
| contentcss = text-align: left; font-size: 100%; width: 55%;
| header = Leg 6 – United States
| content = 
"Detroit Rock City"
"Shout It Out Loud"
"Deuce"
"War Machine"
"Heaven's on Fire"
"I Love It Loud" (Gene breathes fire)
"Lick It Up" (with "Won't Get Fooled Again" by The Who snippet)
"Calling Dr. Love"
"Say Yeah"
"Cold Gin" (with guitar solo)
"Tears Are Falling"
"Psycho Circus" (partial)
"100,000 Years" (outro only, with drum solo)
"God of Thunder" (with bass solo; Gene spits blood)
"Love Gun" (Paul flies to stage in crowd)
"I Was Made for Lovin' You"
"Black Diamond"

Encore:
"Beth" (Eric Singer on piano)
"Do You Love Me"
"Rock and Roll All Nite"

Setlist slightly varied between shows
"Deuce" was performed prior to "Love Gun" on August 18.
}}

{{hidden
| headercss = background: #ccccff; font-size: 100%; width: 55%;
| contentcss = text-align: left; font-size: 100%; width: 55%;
| header = Leg 7 – South America
| content = 
"Detroit Rock City"
"Shout It Out Loud"
"Deuce"
"War Machine"
"Heaven's on Fire"
"I Love It Loud" (Gene breathes fire)
"Say Yeah"
"Cold Gin" (with guitar solo)
"Lick It Up" (with "Won't Get Fooled Again" by The Who snippet)
"Calling Dr. Love"
"Tears Are Falling"
"Psycho Circus" (partial)
"100,000 Years" (outro only, with drum solo)
"God of Thunder" (with bass solo; Gene spits blood)
"Love Gun" (Paul flies to stage in crowd)
"I Was Made for Lovin' You"
"Black Diamond"

Encore:
"Beth" (Eric Singer on piano)
"Do You Love Me"
"Rock and Roll All Nite"
}}

{{hidden
| headercss = background: #ccccff; font-size: 100%; width: 55%;
| contentcss = text-align: left; font-size: 100%; width: 55%;
| header = Leg 8 – United States
| content = 
"Detroit Rock City"
"Shout It Out Loud"
"Deuce"
"War Machine"
"Heaven's on Fire"
"I Love It Loud" (Gene breathes fire)
"Say Yeah"
"Cold Gin" (with guitar solo)
"Lick It Up" (with "Won't Get Fooled Again" by The Who snippet)
"Calling Dr. Love"
"Tears Are Falling"
"Psycho Circus" (partial)
"100,000 Years" (outro only, with drum solo)
"God of Thunder" (with bass solo; Gene spits blood)
"Love Gun" (Paul flies to stage in crowd)
"I Was Made for Lovin' You"
"Black Diamond"

Encore:
"Beth" (Eric Singer on piano)
"Do You Love Me"
"Rock and Roll All Nite"

Setlist slightly varied between shows
"Say Yeah", "Calling Dr. Love", "Tears Are Falling" and "Do You Love Me" were not performed on May 19, 2022.
}}

{{hidden
| headercss = background: #ccccff; font-size: 100%; width: 55%;
| contentcss = text-align: left; font-size: 100%; width: 55%;
| header = Leg 9 – Europe
| content = 
"Detroit Rock City"
"Shout It Out Loud"
"Deuce"
"War Machine"
"Heaven's on Fire"
"I Love It Loud" (Gene breathes fire)
"Say Yeah"
"Cold Gin" (with guitar solo)
"Lick It Up" (with "Won't Get Fooled Again" by The Who snippet)
"Calling Dr. Love"
"Tears Are Falling"
"Psycho Circus" (partial)
"100,000 Years" (outro only, with drum solo)
"God of Thunder" (with bass solo; Gene spits blood)
"Love Gun" (Paul flies to stage in crowd)
"I Was Made for Lovin' You"
"Black Diamond"

Encore:
"Beth" (Eric Singer on piano)
"Do You Love Me"
"Rock and Roll All Nite"
}}

{{hidden
| headercss = background: #ccccff; font-size: 100%; width: 55%;
| contentcss = text-align: left; font-size: 100%; width: 55%;
| header = Leg 10 – Australia
| content = 
"Detroit Rock City"
"Shout It Out Loud"
"Deuce"
"War Machine"
"Heaven's on Fire"
"I Love It Loud" (Gene breathes fire)
"Say Yeah"
"Cold Gin" (with guitar solo)
"Lick It Up" (with "Won't Get Fooled Again" by The Who snippet)
"Calling Dr. Love"
"Do You Love Me"
"Psycho Circus" (partial)
"100,000 Years" (outro only, with drum solo)
"God of Thunder" (with bass solo; Gene spits blood)
"Love Gun" (Paul flies to stage in crowd)
"I Was Made for Lovin' You"
"Black Diamond"

Encore:
"Beth" (Eric Singer on piano)
"Shandi"
"Rock and Roll All Nite"
}}

{{hidden
| headercss = background: #ccccff; font-size: 100%; width: 55%;
| contentcss = text-align: left; font-size: 100%; width: 55%;
| header = United States / Japan / Mexico
| content = 
"Detroit Rock City"
"Shout It Out Loud"
"Deuce"
"War Machine"
"Heaven's on Fire"
"I Love It Loud" (Gene breathes fire)
"Say Yeah"
"Cold Gin" (with guitar solo)
"Lick It Up" (with "Won't Get Fooled Again" by The Who snippet)
"Calling Dr. Love"
"Makin' Love"
"Psycho Circus" (partial)
"100,000 Years" (outro only, with drum solo)
"God of Thunder" (with bass solo; Gene spits blood)
"Love Gun" (Paul flies to stage in crowd)
"I Was Made for Lovin' You"
"Black Diamond"

Encore:
"Beth" (Eric Singer on piano)
"Do You Love Me"
"Rock and Roll All Nite"

Setlist slightly varied between shows
"Deuce", "Say Yeah" and "Makin' Love" were only performed in Tokyo, Japan on November 30.
"Beth" was only performed in West Palm Beach on September 21 and in Tokyo.
}}

Tour dates 

 At this show, the band performed for 45 minutes until a storm resulted in them stopping the rest of the show.
 For this show, the band and the audience sang "Happy Birthday" to Gene Simmons, as he turned 70 the following day.
 The band and the audience sang "Happy Birthday" to the band's manager Doc McGhee who turned 69.
 Yoshiki made an appearance to perform "Beth" and "Rock and Roll All Nite" with the band.
 Yoshiki joined the band again for this show.
 There was no opening act for this show, as David Lee Roth's Las Vegas residency legally prevented him from performing elsewhere in Nevada.
 The band dedicated "Do You Love Me" to Kobe Bryant and the victims of the 2020 Calabasas helicopter crash at this show.
  Simmons celebrated his birthday at this show with the band and audience singing "Happy Birthday", as he had turned 72.
 At this show, Simmons' platform malfunctioned during the opening song, tilting to one side. Simmons was able to maintain his balance until his platform was carefully lowered while the band performed an extended introduction.
 On the first of two performances in Sydney, Simmons celebrated his birthday with the band and audience singing "Happy Birthday" while being given a cake by the band's manager McGhee, as he turned 73 the day before.
 Billed as Kiss' final Japan performance.
 Billed as Kiss' final Mexico performance.

Postponed and cancelled dates

Extra concerts

Personnel

Kiss
Paul Stanley – vocals, rhythm guitar
Gene Simmons – vocals, bass
Eric Singer – drums, piano, vocals
Tommy Thayer – lead guitar, vocals

Guest appearances
Yoshiki – piano on "Beth", drums on "Rock and Roll All Nite" (December 11 and 17, 2019)

References 
Notes

References

External links
Kiss Online

2019 concert tours
2020 concert tours
2021 concert tours
2022 concert tours
2023 concert tours
Kiss (band) concert tours
Farewell concert tours
Concert tours postponed due to the COVID-19 pandemic
Concert tours of North America
Concert tours of Europe
Concert tours of Asia
Concert tours of South America
Concert tours of Oceania
Concert tours of Canada
Concert tours of the United States
Concert tours of Mexico
Concert tours of Germany
Concert tours of Austria
Concert tours of Sweden
Concert tours of Finland
Concert tours of Russia
Concert tours of France
Concert tours of Belgium
Concert tours of the Netherlands
Concert tours of Norway
Concert tours of Italy
Concert tours of Switzerland
Concert tours of the United Kingdom
Concert tours of Japan
Concert tours of the United Arab Emirates